The A525 is a major route from Rhyl in Wales to Newcastle-under-Lyme in England. The route passes near Denbigh, through Ruthin, through Wrexham and near Whitchurch.

The route is a dual carriageway just south of Rhyl. As of 10 March, 2010, the section between Wrexham and Whitchurch is not classified as a primary route, and the section between Burleydam, (to the East of Whitchurch where it is a "TOTSO" with the A530 to Nantwich) and Newcastle (via Audlem) is also now a non-primary A road.

Route 

Rhyl (junctions with A548 road);
Rhuddlan (junctions with A547 road);
A55 road, junctions 27 & 27a;
St Asaph;
Trefnant, (junction with A541 road);
roundabouts with A543 road;
Llanrhaeadr (bypassed);
Rhewl;
Ruthin (junction and roundabout with A494 road);
Llanfair Dyffryn Clwyd;
Nant y Garth Pass
junction with A542 road;
crossed by A5104 road south of Llandegla;
Four Crosses;
Bwlchgwyn;
Coedpoeth;
Intersection with A483 road;
Wrexham (crosses A543 road as part of ring road);
Marchwiel (junction with A528 road);
bypasses Bangor on Dee;
junction with A539 road;
Eglwys Cross;
junction with A495 road;
joins A41 trunk road to form Whitchurch bypass;
leaves A41 to continue through Broughall;
junction with A530 road;
Audlem (crosses A529 road and crosses Shropshire Union Canal);
Buerton;
Woore (crosses A51 road);
Madeley;
passes under M6 motorway
Madeley Heath – junction with A531 road;
Newcastle-under-Lyme – junction with A34 road

Names of A525
Parts of the A525 are named roads, including:
Wrexham Road
Nant y Garth Pass
Lon Parcwr (Park Lane)
Ruthin Road
Newcastle Road

References

External links 

Its article by the Society for All British Road Enthusiasts (describes route in reverse order to above)

Roads in Cheshire
Roads in Shropshire
Transport in Staffordshire
Roads in Wrexham County Borough